Dalston Hall is a fortified country house at Dalston in Cumbria, England. It is a Grade II* listed building.

History
Dalston Hall was built around 1500 by John Dalston and incorporated a Peel tower and a baronial hall. An inscription below the parapet says JOHN DALLSTON ELSABET MI WYF MAD YS BYLDYNG. A west wing was added in 1556. The house remained in the possession of the Dalston family for many generations, of whom several were sheriffs and MPs for the county of Cumberland. During the Siege of Carlisle, Sir George Dalston was forced to flee Dalston Hall when General Leslie requisitioned it as the Covenantor headquarters.

In 1761, Monkhouse Davison, a London grocer, bought the house and owned it for 32 years until his death. In 1897, the hall was acquired by Edmund Wright Stead, owner and director of Stead McAlpin, calico printers, who commissioned architect C.J. Ferguson to remodel the frontage in red sandstone in 1899.

The hall has been used as a youth training centre and, from 1971, operated as a public hotel.

In popular culture
Dalston Hall featured in episode six of the sixth series of the Living TV series Most Haunted.

See also

Grade II* listed buildings in Cumbria
Listed buildings in Dalston, Cumbria

References

Country houses in Cumbria
Grade II* listed buildings in Cumbria
Peel towers in Cumbria
Dalston, Cumbria